The S.A.D.O. (Società Anonima Decostruzionismi Organici, Anonymous Society of Organic Deconstructionisms) band took shape in 1994 in Italy, from the Arcansiel group (Gianni Opezzo, Paolo Baltaro and Sandro Marinoni), with Diego Marzi on percussion. In the same year, they recorded the songs that would be included in Implosioni, their first album. One year later, in 1995, they recorded Teratoarchetipia, followed by La Differanza in 2002. In the meantime, the group went on tour in Italy and Europe. In 2007, with Boris Savoldelli on vocals, Luigi Ranghino on piano, and Andrea Beccaro on drums, they recorded Holzwege (AMS) and carried out a live sound deconstruction in seven movements based on the seven propositions from the Tractatus Logico Philosophicus by Ludwig Wittgenstein. In 2008, they brought on stage "Un Imprescindibile Momento di Cultura Italiana" (An Indispensable Moment of Italian Culture), a show based on deconstructing classical songs from the 20th-century Italian pop music repertoire. From the original shooting of the show, taking place at "Le Pétit Theatre des Officine Sonore" in Vercelli, they later drew the homonymous discographic release.
 
Each concert is conceived as a single piece with a strong presence of improvisation combined with written parts. The S.A.D.O. have attended several musical and cultural events, including the Musica e Letteratura meeting organized by the faculty of philosophy of the Università del Piemonte Orientale (Italy). Most noteworthily, in 2008 they won the twelfth edition of the Omaggio Demetrio Stratos"and the Premio Darwin musiche italiane non convenzionali. In 2010, fashion designer Rui Leonardes used their song "Aristotele's Tantalium Condenser" (from the Holzwege album) as the soundtrack for his 2010 collection show during the London Fashion Week (The Bathhouse) in London. In 2011 they were winners of the 2010 edition of the Prog Award for Best 2010 Production for Weather Underground. The song "Chaos Part 1" is on the soundtrack Ciao Dott. Charcot by Anita Pantin, presented at Latino Videoart Festival of New York 2011

Discography
 Implosioni (Vitaminic, 1994)
 Teratoarchetipia (Vitaminic, 1995)
 Holzwege (AMS/BTF-VM2000, 2007)
 Guitars dancing in the light (compilation) (Mellow, 2008)
 Imprescindibile momento di cultura italiana (live) (AMS/BTF-VM2000, 2009)
 La DifferAnza (2001–2010 special re-edition) (Banksville, Clinical Archives, Creative Commons, 2010)
 Weather Underground with Guido Michelone and Franz Krauspenhaar (Banksville/Audioglobe, 2010)
 More Animals at the Gates of Reason – A Tribute to Pink Floyd (compilation) (BTF, 2013)
 Musiche per signorine da marito - Cura uditiva per la narcolessia in forma Sentenziale (audiofarmaco) Banksville Records, 2019 (BAA-38178) produced by Paolo Baltaro.
 TANATOFOBIA - Vaccino uditivo contro la paura di morire in forma sentenziale (audiofarmaco) Banksville Records, 2023 (BAA-38179) produced by Paolo Baltaro & Diego Marzi.

References

External links
 

Vercelli